Bell Centre, formerly known as Molson Centre, is a multi-purpose arena located in Montreal, Quebec, Canada. Opened on March 16, 1996, it is the home arena of the Montreal Canadiens of the National Hockey League (NHL), replacing the Montreal Forum. It is owned by the Molson family via the team's ownership group Groupe CH, and managed via Groupe CH subsidiary Evenko.

With a capacity of 21,105 in its hockey configuration, Bell Centre is the largest ice hockey arena in the world. Alongside hockey, Bell Centre has hosted major concerts, and occasional mixed martial arts and professional wrestling events. Since it opened in 1996, it has consistently been listed as one of the world's busiest arenas, usually receiving the highest attendance of any arena in Canada. In 2012, it was the fifth-busiest arena in the world based on ticket sales for non-sporting events.

History
Construction began on the site on June 22, 1993, almost two weeks after the Canadiens defeated the Los Angeles Kings at the Forum for their 24th and most recent Stanley Cup. The name of the arena initially reflected Molson, Inc., a brewing company which was owner of the Canadiens at the time. Molson elected not to keep the naming rights when they sold the team and the name was officially changed on September 1, 2002, after Bell Canada acquired the naming rights.

On October 14, 2015, it was announced that Bell Centre would undergo renovations, including the replacement of all the seats, renovated hallways and concessions, new restaurants, public Wi-Fi, and the planned conversion of Avenue des Canadiens-de-Montréal (the section of De la Gauchetière Street on which the arena is situated) into a pedestrian-only street. The renovations, which were not expected to interfere with normal operations, have a budget of $100 million.

Location

Bell Centre is located in downtown Montreal in the borough of Ville-Marie, near the corner of Avenue des Canadiens-de-Montréal (formerly Rue de la Gauchetière Ouest) and de la Montagne Street. The Lucien L'Allier commuter rail terminal, to which it is connected, is next door on that corner. In addition it is located across the street from the 1250 René-Lévesque skyscraper. It is easily accessible by public transportation, as it is linked to both Lucien-L'Allier and Bonaventure Metro stations. It is also connected to the underground city and Central Station.

Arena information

It has a seating capacity of 21,105,
making it the largest hockey arena in the world. It also holds six restaurants.
Capacities of the centre are:
 Hockey: 21,105
 Basketball: 22,114
 Concerts: 19,200
 Amphitheatre: 10,000–14,000
 Theatre: 5,000–9,000
 Hemicycle: 2,000–4,000

The public address announcer for the Canadiens' games is Michel Lacroix, while the national anthem singer alternates every home game after Charles Prevost-Linton was not asked to return at the end of the 2013–2014 season. Most notable amongst these rotating performers is Quebecois pop legend Ginette Reno, whose appearances to sing the Canadian anthem at playoff games were highly popular.  Diane Bibeau plays the organ on game nights.

A new scoreboard was installed prior of the 2008–2009 season. The new scoreboard consists of four  video panels. It was the biggest in the NHL until 2012.

It is one of only two NHL arenas that uses an old-style siren to mark the end of periods instead of a horn; the other is TD Garden in Boston. The sirens were inherited from the arenas' predecessor facilities, coming from the disused Montreal Forum and the Boston Garden respectively.

Seating
Unlike most North American arenas, which have generally been designed by Populous and its predecessors, the Bell Centre was designed by a local consortium, and has many unique design features. The grandstands are sloped steeply to improve sight lines. Washrooms on the 100 level are centralized on a specific lower level located at each end.

Bell Centre is arranged in a three-tier layout: The lower 100 section, commonly referred to as "the reds" since these seats are coloured red; the 200 section situated between the two levels of private and corporate boxes, known as "Club Desjardins" (which features premium amenities such as larger seats and free food and non-alcoholic drinks), and the upper 300–400 section.

The 300–400 section is divided into three zones by seat colour: white section rows AA–FF, the grey section rows A–D, and the blue section, labelled "400," and consisting of rows A–D. The ends of the 400 section are further divided into two more groups. At the end where the Canadiens shoot towards twice is the Coors Light Zone, featuring section cheerleaders and a band playing in the hallway. At the opposite end is the Family Zone, which features child-specific ticket prices and limited alcohol.

Seats behind the press gondola, in Sections 318, 319, and 320, feature their own scoreboards on the back of the gondola due to the normal scoreboard being blocked.

Interior

After some early complaints of a generic feel, especially compared to the Forum, the Canadiens started to incrementally decorate the building with celebrations of the team's history, including a ring of players around the top level of seating.  The Molson Ex Zone features a live band stage and its own red theme.

Entertainment

Bell Centre is the main venue in Montreal for large-scale entertainment events. Many artists have performed at the arena, like Céline Dion, Gloria Estefan, Stromae, Twenty One Pilots, Tina Turner, Prince, Shakira, Elton John, Billy Joel, Shania Twain, Cher, Bon Jovi, Van Halen, Rush, Coldplay, Rihanna, Guns N' Roses, Slipknot, Ariana Grande, Taylor Swift, Demi Lovato, Katy Perry, Paul McCartney, Lady Gaga, Janet Jackson, Roger Waters, Spice Girls, Justin Timberlake, Barbra Streisand, Madonna, Metallica, Iron Maiden, The Rolling Stones, Aerosmith, and Dua Lipa.

The singer who has performed the most times at the Bell Centre is Céline Dion with 50 performances between 1996 and 2020 from her Falling into You: Around the World tour in 1996 and 1997, Let's Talk About Love World Tour in 1998 and 1999, Taking Chances World Tour in 2008 and 2009, Summer Tour 2016 in 2016 and Courage World Tour in 2019 and 2020. On December 31, 1999, she performed the final show of the Let's Talk About Love World Tour, which was her last performance before a three-year hiatus from the music industry.

In August 1999, the Third National Tour of Les Misérables visited for a 12-day run. Robert Marien, who originated the role of Valjean in Paris in 1980, as well as in the bilingual Canadian tour which started in Montreal in 1991, joined the cast exclusively for the Montreal stop.

Sports

Ice hockey
The final two games of the three-game 1996 World Cup of Hockey championship series were held at Bell Centre (the United States won both games, defeating Canada in the series 2–1). Bell Centre was also host to two pool games in the 2004 World Cup of Hockey. The Bell Centre was the host of the 2009 NHL All-Star Game and hosted the 2009 NHL Entry Draft and 2022 NHL Entry Draft, the latter of which saw the Canadiens make the very first pick in the draft, which turned out to be Juraj Slafkovsky.

Montreal Canadiens home games have been consistently sold out since January 2004. Additionally, the Canadiens have among the top attendance figures in the NHL. For the 2009–2010 season, the Habs had the highest attendance played at their home arena. All 21,273 seats were sold in 45 minutes on May 12, 2010, for fans to watch the 7th game in the playoff series versus the Pittsburgh Penguins, which was shown on the big screens. Noise levels in the arena allegedly reached as high as 110 dB when goals were scored by the Canadiens, most notably, during the 2010 Stanley Cup playoffs, during Game #6 against the Pittsburgh Penguins on May 10, 2010, making it one of the loudest NHL arenas during hockey games.

On December 9, 2014, the Canadiens hosted the Vancouver Canucks, the first home game since the death of Jean Béliveau. The game was preceded by a memorial tribute to him. Bell Centre remained sold-out that night with 21,286 fans in attendance and one empty seat left for Mr. Beliveau, with the official attendance shortened by one to honour him.

Bell Centre hosted its first Stanley Cup Final in 2021, with games three and four against the defending champion Tampa Bay Lightning played inside the arena. The Canadiens were allowed to have 2,500 fans from May 29 to June 14, and later, 3,500 fans was allowed for the third round against the Vegas Golden Knights and the Stanley Cup Final due to Quebec government public health restrictions in response to the COVID-19 pandemic in Quebec. The Canadiens had hoped to further increase their arena capacity limit to 50% of the arena's total seating capacity (10,500 people) for the Stanley Cup Final, however, that request was denied by the Quebec government. While the arena's capacity was limited to 3,500 fans during the third round and the Final, thousands more fans gathered outside the arena to watch the games on a TV screen outside of the La Cage sports bar situated adjacent to the arena.

From September 26 to October 8, 7,500 fans were also allowed at Bell Centre for the pre-season games, and for the opening day on October 13, the Quebec government made new rules and stated that the Canadiens could return to its full capacity of 21,105 people.

Basketball

Since October 2010, Bell Centre has hosted selected NBA preseason games, primarily featuring the Toronto Raptors; the first was held on  October 22, 2010, with the Raptors hosting the New York Knicks. It has since hosted preseason games as part of the NBA Canada Series, which have also included all-U.S. games.

Mixed martial arts
Bell Centre hosted UFC 83 in April 2008, marking the first UFC mixed martial arts event to take place in Canada. The main event was a rematch between Welterweight champion Matt Serra and Montreal native Georges St-Pierre. The tickets available to the public sold out in under one minute, and the event set the all time UFC attendance record, at that time (since surpassed by UFC 129 in Toronto). Other UFC events have subsequently been held at Bell Centre, including UFC 97, UFC 113, UFC 124, UFC 154 and UFC 158, the most recent three of which were headlined by St-Pierre.

Professional wrestling 
Bell Centre has occasionally hosted WWE professional wrestling events, including four pay-per-views (Survivor Series in 1997, No Way Out in 2003, Breaking Point in 2009 and Elimination Chamber in 2023), as well as 11 broadcasts of Raw and 8 broadcasts of SmackDown. Elimination Chamber 2023 marked the first time that the Chamber structure was on Canadian soil and only the second time in history that the structure was outside of the United States, following the 2022 event that was held in Jeddah, Saudi Arabia, and featured Laval native Sami Zayn competing in the event's main event match for the Undisputed WWE Universal Championship against Roman Reigns. In April 2019, Bell Centre hosted both Raw and SmackDown on consecutive nights for the 2019 Superstar Shake-up, the first time in WWE history that the event was held at an arena outside of the United States. On August 19, 2022, Bell Centre hosted the 1,200th episode in the history of WWE SmackDown.

During Survivor Series 1997, Bell Centre was the site of the infamous "Montreal Screwjob"—a match where Calgary-native Bret Hart controversially lost the WWF Championship to his rival Shawn Michaels. Hart had signed a contract to leave WWF for the rival World Championship Wrestling (WCW) the following month and did not want to lose a championship match to Michaels in his own country. The original plan was for the match to end by disqualification after a brawl between the wrestlers' allies, which would have allowed Hart to lose or vacate the championship at a later date before leaving the promotion. However, WWF owner Vince McMahon intervened without Hart's knowledge, and had the referee declare a Michaels victory by submission after performing a Sharpshooter on Hart, even though he had not actually submitted. Wrestling writer Mike Johnson considered the match to be "arguably the most talked-about match in the history of professional wrestling". Eight years later, in the same venue, Michaels cut his infamous "Who's your daddy, Montreal?" heel promo in the lead-up to his impending match with Hulk Hogan at SummerSlam 2005, where he referenced the Screwjob during his promo, receiving plenty of heat from the Montreal fans.

Brock Lesnar made his televised WWE debut at Bell Centre on the March 18, 2002 Raw after WrestleMania X8 in Toronto, interfering in the Hardcore match that was taking place between Maven and Al Snow. A wall on the concourse of the arena depicting iconic events that took place inside the arena includes Lesnar's debut among others.

Retired jerseys
The following numbers have been retired by the Canadiens and hang from the rafters:

While Elmer Lach and Henri Richard both wore the number 16, they were given separate ceremonies unlike Cournoyer and Moore. All have their own banner.

On October 18, 2005, the Canadiens also raised the following numbers on a single banner in honour of the former MLB team Montreal Expos, who left the city for Washington, D.C. after the 2004 season:
 8 Gary Carter
 10 Andre Dawson and Rusty Staub
 30 Tim Raines

The only other banners hanging from the rafters at the arena are those of the Canadiens' Stanley Cup championship banners. Unlike other NHL arenas, the Canadiens do not display division or conference championship banners, despite the fact they have won many championships over the years (including 24 Stanley Cups). As with the Forum, only Stanley Cup championship banners are raised to the rafters.

See also
 Bonaventure (metro station)
 Connected via the underground city
 List of indoor arenas in Canada
 Statue of Guy Lafleur

References

External links

 

1996 establishments in Quebec
Basketball venues in Quebec
Boxing venues in Quebec
Bell Canada
Downtown Montreal
Indoor ice hockey venues in Quebec
Indoor lacrosse venues in Canada
Leadership in Energy and Environmental Design certified buildings in Canada
Music venues completed in 1996
Music venues in Montreal
National Basketball Association venues
National Hockey League venues
Quebec Major Junior Hockey League arenas
Sports venues completed in 1996
Sports venues in Montreal
Montreal Canadiens